Lindsay Reid-Ross (born 12 October 1953) is a South African cricketer and field hockey player. He played in ten first-class matches between 1975/76 and 1983/84.

See also
 List of Eastern Province representative cricketers

References

External links
 

1953 births
Living people
South African cricketers
Eastern Province cricketers
Northerns cricketers
Western Province cricketers
Cricketers from Port Elizabeth
South African male field hockey players